Presidential elections are due to be held in Senegal on February 25, 2024.

Background
Several parties have announced their intent to run for office in 2024, but they must first receive sufficient support from the general public to pass the sponsorship stage. Any presidential candidate must receive between 0.8 percent and 1 percent of the electorate's signatures. These signatures must be collected with a minimum of 2,000 sponsorships in each of the minimum seven of Senegal's fourteen regions.

On February 17, the day before the date was revealed for the upcoming elections, Senegalese opposition candidate Ousmane Sonko, was forcibly taken from his vehicle in the midst of rallies outside a Dakar courthouse where his trial was taking place. The opposition leader was in court as part of a civil lawsuit against him by Senegal's tourism minister for defamation and public insults. A judge on Thursday postponed the trial until next month.

References

Senegal
Presidential elections in Senegal
2024 in Senegal